Patrick Holtet (born 2 April 1981) is a retired Norwegian footballer that currently works for Kongsvinger in the Norwegian First Division.

He was earlier in Viking and were capped in one game in the Norwegian Premier League against Skeid. He later transferred to Skeid.
After playing over 150 games for Kongsvinger he retired as a player in 2009, but stayed in the club to work as a coach.

References

External links
 Player profile at Kongsvinger's homepage

Norwegian footballers
Viking FK players
Skeid Fotball players
Kongsvinger IL Toppfotball players
1981 births
Living people
Association football midfielders
Footballers from Oslo